William & Kate: The Movie is the first of two unrelated American television films about the relationship between Prince William and Catherine "Kate" Middleton (now The Prince and Princess of Wales), directed by Mark Rosman and written by Nancey Silvers. The film was a ratings success, despite the negative reception from critics. The second film William & Catherine: A Royal Romance was produced by the Hallmark Channel and released in August 2011.

Produced by Lifetime, the filming of William & Kate took place mostly in Los Angeles, with some second unit location filming in the United Kingdom, and the release date was 18 April 2011. This came eleven days before the wedding of William and Catherine on 29 April 2011.

Kate Middleton is played by Camilla Luddington, an English-born actress, while the part of William was taken by Nico Evers-Swindell, a New Zealander.

Cast
 Nico Evers-Swindell – Prince William
 Camilla Luddington – Catherine Middleton
Samantha Whittaker – Olivia Martin
 Jonathan Patrick Moore – Ian Musgrave
 Richard Reid - Derek Rodgers
 Ben Cross – The Prince of Wales
 Calvin Goldspink – James Middleton
 Serena Scott Thomas – Carole Middleton
 Christopher Cousins – Michael Middleton
Justin Hanlon – Prince Harry
 Trilby Glover – Margaret Hemmings-Wellington
Mary Elise Hayden – Pippa Middleton
 Charles Shaughnessy – Flight Instructor
 Louise Linton – Vanessa Rose Bellows
Stephen Marsh – Professor Durham
Theo Cross – Trevor
 Victoria Tennant – Celia

Reception
The film received negative reviews, with The Guardian calling it "awful, toe-curlingly, teeth-furringly, pillow-bitingly ghastly", the Daily Mirror saying it "contains moments so royally ridiculous they could only have occurred in the mind of a third-rate script writer"  and the London Evening Standard saying its only positive was that "it is recognisably a film, in that it takes place on a screen. Events run in a forward direction." The film has also been criticised for its use of American actors, for some of its images, and for first unit filming taking place in the United States.

References

External links 
 
 

2011 television films
2011 films
2011 biographical drama films
2011 romantic drama films
American biographical drama films
American drama television films
American romantic drama films
Biographical films about British royalty
Biographical television films
Cultural depictions of Catherine, Princess of Wales
Cultural depictions of William, Prince of Wales
Films about weddings in the United Kingdom
Films directed by Mark Rosman
Lifetime (TV network) films
Romance films based on actual events
Romance television films
2010s American films